Brenna Adams byskups (The Burning of Bishop Adam) is a short Old Norse narrative (þáttr) about Adam of Melrose, Bishop of Caithness and the events that led to his death in 1222. It is preserved in Flateyjarbók and sometimes included as an appendix to Orkneyinga saga.

Further reading 

 Anderson, Alan Orr Early Sources of Scottish History, A. D. 500 To 1286, Bibliobazaar, ed. reprinted, 2010,

References 

Þættir